Strzeszyn may refer to the following places:
Strzeszyn, Poznań, a neighbourhood in the city of Poznań
Strzeszyn, Lesser Poland Voivodeship (south Poland)
Strzeszyn, Pomeranian Voivodeship (north Poland)
Strzeszyn, Gmina Borne Sulinowo in West Pomeranian Voivodeship (north-west Poland)
Strzeszyn, Gmina Grzmiąca in West Pomeranian Voivodeship (north-west Poland)